Antônio José Rodrigues Cavalcante (born March 8, 1962) is a Brazilian actor and comedian, who is known professionally as Tom Cavalcante.

Early life 
Cavalcante was born in Fortaleza, Ceará, Brazil on March 8, 1962, as Antônio José Rodrigues Cavalcante.

Career 
Cavalcante began his career in 1976, performing in bars in his home state of Ceará doing humor skits and impressions of various artists. In 1982, Tom went to Rio de Janeiro and asked for a job on television, but he was turned down. In 1984, he tried to participate in the SBT Show de Calouros talent show, but he was not selected by the production to perform on stage. In the same year, he got a job as a radio broadcaster at Rádio Verdes Mares, where he presented the comedy show Ligação Direta for five years. During the 1986 elections, he worked by opening political rallies with comic skits. In 1987, he presented the television newsprogrm VM Notícias, on Rede Globo-affiliate TV Verdes Mares. In 1989, he met Chico Anysio, who invited him to return to Rio de Janeiro to participate in the Chico Anysio Show. With the program's end he began to participate in another of Chico's shows: Escolinha do Professor Raimundo, where he played the drunkard João Canabrava, a character created by himself. In 1996, Daniel Filho invited him to participate in Sai de Baixo, playing the doorman Ribamar. From 1999 to 2001 he worked in Globo's comedy shows Zorra Total and  Megatom.

Unsatisfied with his treatment by Globo, Cavalcante resigned from the station and signed with TV Record, where he presented his own program, Show do Tom, from 2004 to 2011. In 2013, Cavalcante and his family moved to the United States, where he worked on the short film Pizza Me, Mafia, directed by Gui Pereira. Cavalcante returned to Brazil in 2014, and made an appearance on Globo's Domingão do Faustão, eleven years after being banned by the station.

Since 2016 Cavalcante presented at Globosat's cable channel Multishow in the shows #PartiuShopping and Multi Tom, where he performed as several characters, among them Tomsonaro (an impression of president Jair Bolsonaro). He presented and hosted the show Todos os Toms in September 2019 at the Riomar Theater. and starred in the 2017 comedy film Os Parças.

Filmography

Films

TV series

Awards and nominations

References

External links 

 
 Official site  

Brazilian actors
Brazilian male comedians
1962 births
People from Fortaleza
Living people